Cassata is a surname. Notable people with the surname include:

Francesco Cassata (born 1997), Italian soccer player
John Joseph Cassata (1908–1989), American Roman Catholic bishop
Rick Cassata (born 1947), American football player
Ryan Cassata (born 1993), American musician, public speaker, writer, filmmaker, and actor